In the competitive athletic sport of cheerleading, stunts are defined as building performances that display a team’s skill or dexterity. Stunting in cheerleading has previously been referred to as building pyramids. Stunts range from basic two-legged stunts, to one-legged extended stunts, and high-flying basket tosses. Stunts are classified into seven levels of increasing difficulty. There are two recognized styles of stunting: coed and all-girl. Cheerleading teams are restricted to specific stunt rules based on the guidelines of certain associations, organizations and their designated level. Therefore, some stunts may be permitted in certain divisions but illegal in others due to different stunt rules and regulations. The level of difficulty an organization allows depends on where the teams stunt and practice as well as the type of organization they are a part of (school, club, college, etc). In most situations, club cheer, also known as all-star, do more of a classic type of stunting which is not as common in school cheer. While high school cheerleading can have teams with high-caliber stunts, collegiate cheerleading tends to focus on the pyramid aspect of stunting. Having two flyers on top of two bases is very common in college cheerleading.

Athletes involved
A "group stunt" will typically involve a flyer, two bases (one main and one side), and a back spot, or occasionally include a front spot. These can be all-girl or coed. A "partner stunt" will involve two athletes - aflyer and a main base. These tend to be coed, but all-girl versions do occur. A third athlete, a spotter, will be involved depending upon the skill level of the stunt executed and the rules and regulations for that skill.

The flyer is lifted into the air during a stunt and is on top of the stunt or pyramid. Because many of the  a flyer can perform require a high level of flexibility, this is a desired trait for the role. Flyers are also typically the shorter and leaner people on the team, but other members can act as a flyer depending on their abilities and the needs of the team. The flyer's main job is to squeeze her muscles together in order for her bases to be able to perform stunts from below her. The flyer can make or break the stunt since she has control over what is put up in the air.

Bases  
Bases are the athletes that hold the flyer or top girl in the air during the stunt. Bases are very strong and are usually assigned together based on height to create a level platform for the flyer to perform an action. The bases are responsible for understanding grips on the flyer's shoes so that the stunt can flow smoothly. It is crucial that bases stay in the same position when they toss so they are able to catch the flyer safely in a cradle position. Different levels of stunting come with different styles of grips for the bases.

 Main base: This base is the left side of the stunt and helps with the stability of the flyer's foot. In a one-leg extension stunt, the main base will lift the toe and heel of the foot to increase stability and prevent the flyer from tilting forward or backward and will be almost directly under the stunt. Their grips tend to be simpler and easier to adjust. The main base must also be the first to react if the stunt seems to be unstable to keep it up in the air.
 Secondary base: This position can also be referred to as "side base". The secondary bases help lift the flyer up into the air and support the flyer's foot. The side base mainly controls the rotation of the foot. They hold the ball of the foot where the flyer's weight should be. Their grips include throwing and catching, but occasionally they will have a more complicated stance.
 Back spot: The back spot is also called a "third" and gets their name by standing behind the stunt. They are not essential but extremely common since in a typical stunt group they are included. They normally will organize a stunt by calling out its name and the necessary counts to ensure group synchronization. Back spots can help save a stunt if it appears to be falling and serve as almost a kickstand for the top girl. Additionally, the back spot will actively stabilize the stunt, commonly supporting or lifting the flyer's ankles, calves, thighs, or buttocks. Due to the back spot's responsibilities, they are generally the tallest members of the stunt group.

Spotters

Spotters are additional athletes whose primary responsibility is to watch the stunt and assist the flyer in the case of a fall or accident. Their main goal is to protect the flyer's head and neck from injury. Spotter involvement can range from nearly constantly holding the stunt, such as a back spot, to standing at the back of a cheerleading routine should an incident occur.

 Front spot: Similar to the helping role of a back spot, the front spot will support and stabilize the stunt from the front. They are fairly rare, as most stunts are designed to be performed without one, but are sometimes added due to weaker bases or an uneven number of athletes.
 Additional spot: Additional spots are typically used as a safety precaution, such as when a group is trying new or difficult stunts. Generally, they will only help the stunt if it shows serious signs of falling.

Rules/safety 
The safety rules for the sport of cheerleading are in place to protect the athletes from avoidable injury, and encompass all aspects of any given routine. They are meant to ensure that athletes are trained correctly in each aspect of the sport. As cheerleading has evolved, a basic set of safety expectations have formed to mitigate the risk of catastrophic injury. For example, spotters are often used to protect cheerleaders as they learn new stunts. Teams are expected to be under the supervision of a trained coach and are encouraged to only perform high-level stunts and tosses when mats are available. High school, college, and all-star competitive cheerleading follow different rules, in reflection of the varying levels at which the cheerleaders perform.

Stunting rules and regulations for middle and high school cheerleaders are usually created and enforced by that particular state's athletics governing organization, with many following the American Association for Cheerleading Coaches and Advisors (AACCA) guidelines or the National Federation for High School Athletics (NFHS) handbook. They may include general safety rules about what types of surfaces the participants may perform stunts on (for example, some states don't allow stunts on hard surfaces like a track or basketball court) as well as more specific rules about exactly which stunts, pyramids, and tosses are and are not allowed.

Rules for collegiate squads in the United States are usually similar across the board and are created by USA Cheer The standard to which these rules and regulations are enforced depends on whether each university classifies cheerleading as an official school sport, a club, or some other type of activity. Due to their greater experience and skill set, college able to carry out stunts from a higher skill level, without compromising safety. College squads are allowed to do more difficult stunts such as pyramids building to two and a half people high. Lower levels may only build up to two people high. It is far more dangerous stacking three people on top of each other than just two. While the sheer amount of athletic ability may make it seem more like a sport, no college cheerleading team is formally recognized by the NCAA as a sport; therefore, the rules are not set by the NCAA, they are set by Varsity.

All-star cheer is governed by the United States All Star Federation and the International All Star Federation which divides teams into different levels from 1 through 7, which then determines the difficulty of the stunts being performed.

Types of stunts

Basic Two Leg Stunts
Modified Prep—Like a prep, start with hands cupped, then pop up to a stunt at waist level.  While these are just the basic type of stunting, they are also the fundamentals of more advanced variations of stunts.
  Thigh stand: A thigh stand is one of the most basic stunts. The bases either kneel on one leg or are in a lunge position with their front knees bent so that the flyer may stand on their thighs. This stunt is normally for the lowest of levels and younger athletes.

 
Load (also known as Sponge, Smoosh, Squish, Crunch): This is a fundamental position for cheerleading stunts. It is a loading position where the flyer holds their weight through straight arms on the bases shoulders, and the bases are holding the flyer's feet at their torso level. A group stunt usually jumps into this sponge position before dipping to move into another stunt position. It is a 'mount' or a way of entering into a stunt.
Prep: A stunt in which the flyer stands on two bases' hands and is held up at chest or chin height.This skill is a foundational skill for stunting and may also be referred to as a half or an a-frame. This stunt is learned before all other stunts since it is the most basic form of stunting with a stunt group. If one to were tryout this stunt is expected to be solid before being placed on a team.
 Extension: In an extension, the flyer stands with each foot in the hands of a base similar to a prep, except instead of being held at chin level, the bases extend their arms and block out their shoulder so it creates a solid platform for the top girl. The flyer must hold her weight so that it is easy for the bases to hold her above their heads.

  Cupie or Awesome: The Cupie Is a variation of an extension where the flyer is held above the bases' heads with her feet held close together. If it is performed as a partner stunt, the flyer's feet are together in one fully extended hand of a single base. In a partner stunt, the difference between a cupie and an awesome has to do with what the male base is doing with his free hand. If the free hand is on the hip then it is a cupie, if the free hand is in a high V then it is awesome.

 Teddy Sit or Split-lift: The flyer is in a seated straddle with the two bases holding one hand on her thigh and one on her ankle/foot. The back base holds up her buttocks or waist with her hands. The flyer must center her weight.  This stunt is sometimes called a straddle sit. This stunt is only performed in NFL cheer or in lower levels.
  Shoulder stand: In a shoulder stand, the flyer stands on the base’s shoulders.
 Shoulder sit: In a shoulder sit, the flyer sits on the base's shoulders and wraps her feet around the base's waist. This stunt is an effective way to get the crowd engaged.

One-Leg Stunts

 Lib: The Liberty or "Lib" is the most basic one-leg stunt. Both bases  have a grip on one of the flyer's feet, with the main base typically holding the heel and toe and the secondary or side base holding the middle of the foot. This stunt can be held at chin (prep) level or at the extended level.

Transition Stunts

Inversion
Inversion: This is a transition stunt where the flyer's hands are on the bases shoulders and the flyers shoulders are below his/her waist, while the feet should be above his/ her head.
Rewind (backwards free flipping from ground level): A rewind is a cheerleading stunt where the flyer begins on the ground in a standing position. They are then thrown into the air where they perform a backwards flip and land on their feet. The bases or coed partner assist them by throwing them high enough to flip, and they also help initiate their rotation. The flyer must flip quickly and then let themselves out of the flip in time to land on their feet. They can land on one or two feet in an extended or prep level stunt.
Free flipping
Side-somi to stunt
Ground level handstand released to hand in hand

Release
Switch Up: A switch up is a stunt where a flyer begins the stunt on one foot, gets tossed into the air on that beginning foot, and lands on the other foot. This requires the bases to throw the initial foot and then catch the other one in an extended position, landing in a liberty or heel stretch. The flyer is the one who does the switching, they lift their foot out of the bases hands and replaces their other foot in the same spot to be caught by the bases. It may also be referred to as a tic-up.
 Tic Toc: In this stunt, the flyer begins in a Liberty stunt standing on one leg, and is gently released so they can switch to standing on the other leg. This can be performed in a group stunt with two bases and a back spot, or as a partner stunt with just one base underneath. The action looks visually like a quick switch of legs, and the flyer appears to effortlessly hop from one foot to another. This stunt can be performed starting from and body position, not just a liberty. They can switch from heel stretch to heel stretch, scale to scale, heel stretch to liberty, the possibilities are endless.
Low to High (Full twisting tic toc to extended 1 leg stunt): This stunt begins on a single leg pressed to the top, then lowered into a prep still on the initial single leg. After reaching the prep, the bases throw and release the flyer’s foot and catch her other one in an extended position. The flyer holds her body position on her first foot throughout the first extended position and into the prep. Then, they flyer will switch their foot and replace it to land at the top landing in another body position.
Ball up
Straddle up
Helicopter release: This is a stunt where the flyer gets tossed into the air while doing a 360-degree horizontal rotation with their back parallel to the ground. This release should look similar to the blades of a helicopter.
Twisting release: This is a full 360 twist where the flyer is thrown above her stunt group and completes the twist before being caught in the straight cradle position.

Twisting transition
Includes 1/4 twisting transition, up to 2 and a 1/4 twist

Body Positions
Although a liberty is the basic one leg stunt, flyers will often perform body positions that showcase their flexibility. Some of these positions are quite difficult and may help increase a team’s score at a competition. All of the body positions can be done at the prep (chin) or extension (above head) level.

 Scorpion: The flyer grabs their foot and bends that leg upward behind the body until the toes are close to the back of the head, in a position resembling a scorpion's tail. The foot is secured in place by the opposite hand.
 Needle or Spike: A more advanced variation of the scorpion where the flyer’s leg is perfectly straight when held behind her back.
 Scale: The flyer's leg is held by their hand to the side and the leg is fully extended. The position is similar to the Scorpion, but one of the flyer's hands holds her ankle or calf (instead of her toes) and the other arm is free.
 Heel Stretch: The flyer holds the heel or middle of her foot, with one arm, and extends that leg in front of her, pulling her foot as close to eye level as possible. The other arm may do a range of motions such as a "high v".
 Bow and Arrow: Variation of a heel stretch. The flyer grabs her foot with the opposite side hand, and pulls her leg straight up beside her head. Then she pulls her free arm and upper torso through the hole the leg and arm made, holding it straight.
 Arabesque: The flyer extends and points their leg out behind them and attempt to turn their hip socket out so when the leg is out straight, the side of the leg is facing the audience.
 No-Hands/Chin Chin/Cry Baby: The flyer takes her foot, bends it under her chin, then lets it sit there without any hands.

Dismount
 Step down
 Straight cradle: This is a dismount from a stunt where the flyer is being caught at the end of a stunt in a straight ride position.
 Full down: This is a dismount that is more advanced than a regular straight cradle. The flyer will be tossed out of the bases hands and will complete a 360-degree turn, and will then be caught in a cradle position.
 Twisting dismount
 Free flipping

Basket Tosses

The basic basket toss is not a difficult skill, but it is one that involves significant risk if not performed properly. The name "basket toss" comes from the interlocking grip the bases form with their hands in order to launch the flyer. The flyer is thrown from a load in position, at which their interlocked hands rest at the belly button, and may perform skills or tricks during the toss before being caught in a cradle position. The positions listed here are some of the more common skills performed during a basket toss, however, there are many variations and teams are always working to create new and innovative basket skills. Basket tosses are enforced to only be thrown while cheerleaders are on a soft surface to ensure safety.

 Straight Ride Basket (Level 2+): The flyer is thrown from a load in position. Then, she fully extends her arms by her ears, using her shoulders to set up and holding her body in a straight position. After doing this, the flyer will land in a cradle position. This is the most basic position for all basket tosses and is usually used by intermediate teams (Level 2) or as a warm-up for stunts groups before they try the harder basket tosses.
 Pike Basket (Level 3+): At the peak of the toss, the flyer will bend at the hips in order to bring the chest to the knees, whilst keeping straight legs, folding the body into a piked position. Subsequently, on the way down, the flyer will then arch her back (unfold) and land in a cradle position.
 Toe Touch Basket (Level 3+): At the peak of the toss, the flyer will lift her legs into a straddle or toe-touch position. On the way down, she will snap her legs back together may arch her back to add to the visual.
 Kick-Full (Level 4+)/Kick-Double (Level 5-6+): Starting from either the base's right side or the back of the mat, depending on preference, the flyer will be launched up into the air and reach the front of the stage before reaching the peak of height. The bases follow this movement to then be able to catch the flyer in a cradle position. Once the flyer has reached the top of the basket, they will bring their left arm down and kick up their right leg simultaneously, before bringing the right leg and arm down to form a cradle position whilst completing a full twist. The flyer will then land in a cradle position facing the front. For a kick double, the same steps are required, however, after bringing the leg and arm down into the cradle position at the top of the basket, two twists are required before landing in the bases arms.
 Back tuck basket: This is a flipping basket toss where the flyer will perform a single hip-over-head rotation in the tuck position. This skill is typically performed as a back tuck, but a front flipping basket variation exists.
 The X-Out basket: This is a variation of the back tuck basket. At the last second of the back tuck, the flyer opens their arms and legs wide to make an "X" shape with their body. After hitting the "X" part the flyer rotates their body back to a normal cradle position ready to be caught by the bases.

Pyramids 

A pyramid is defined as two or more stunt groups connected by the top persons holding hands, feet, waist, or legs. There are many varieties of pyramids ranging from simple waist level skills performed by younger teams, to multi person high pyramids performed by elite college teams. Typically a pyramid section will use all athletes on a team as it takes many people to lift, spot, and catch a pyramid. Pyramid sequences are often fast paced, and may involve a variety of heights, mounts, transitions, release moves, and dismounts.

Two High Pyramid
This is the standard type of pyramid and the most commonly performed. Each flyer is supported by a base or bases who are standing on the performing surface. The flyers may connect with each other through many different grips such as holding hands or one person holding another person's extended foot or leg. One flyer may even act as a bracer for another flyer while she performs a flipping or twisting release skill.

Two and a Half High Pyramid
This type of pyramid involves a third layer of people not supported by anyone standing on the ground. The bases will hold the middle level of flyers, usually in a shoulder level stunt, as seen in a standard two person high pyramid. These flyers will then hold additional flyers, usually at the waist level. Because of the height of this type of pyramid, they are usually only performed by very experienced college or club squads as the potential for injury is very high. The Swedish Fall, the Wolf Wall, and the L Stand are all popular variations of the two and a half high pyramid.

References

Cheerleading
Stunts